Soroksár the 23rd district of Budapest, Hungary.

List of mayors

Twin towns - twin cities
  Törökbálint – Hungary
  Nürtingen – Germany
  Odorheiu Secuiesc – Romania
  Tvardica – Bulgaria
  Tongzhou (Beijing) – China
  Sona – Italy
  Thur – Switzerland
  Gentofte – Denmark
  Liesing - Vienna – Austria
  Gdańsk – Poland

References

External links

 
Hungarian German communities